Maylin Wende (née Hausch) (born 22 September 1988) is a German pair skater. With husband and partner Daniel Wende, she is the 2010 Trophée Eric Bompard bronze medalist, the 2013 Nebelhorn Trophy silver medalist, and a two-time German national champion. They have competed twice at the Winter Olympics (2010, 2014) and have placed as high as sixth at the European Championships (2011, 2014).

Career

Early career 
Maylin Hausch began skating in 1992. She skated in singles until 2006, finishing as high as fourth in Junior Ladies at the 2004 German Junior and Novice National Championships.

Hausch took up pair skating at age 17. Her first skating partner was Steffen Hörmann, with whom she was the 2006 German junior national champion. He decided to quit after that competition. Hausch was unable to find a partner afterward and so competed as a single skater.

Partnership with Daniel Wende 
Hausch teamed up with Daniel Wende in September 2008. They train in Oberstdorf and are coached by Karel Fajfr.

In the 2010–11 season, Hausch/Wende won a bronze medal at a Grand Prix event, the 2010 Trophée Eric Bompard.

In 2011–12, the pair placed fourth at the 2011 Nebelhorn Trophy. They were eighth at the 2011 Skate America with Hausch suffering from tendinitis in her foot. At the 2012 European Championships, Hausch/Wende finished seventh. On January 26, during the morning practice before the long programs, Wende collided with Mari Vartmann while they were attempting to avoid a French pair.

Hausch/Wende's training for the 2012–13 season began late due to death and illness in their families; as a result, they withdrew from the 2012 Cup of Russia. Wende experienced a spinal disc herniation in autumn 2012. The pair withdrew from the 2013 German Championships. They were named in the German team to the 2013 European Championships but withdrew as well due to his back problem. Wende was diagnosed with a second herniated disc in January 2013.

She began competing as Maylin Wende in the 2013–14 season.

Personal life 
Hausch and Wende were married in June 2013.

Programs 
With Wende

Competitive highlights 

(with Wende)

References

External links 

 
 Tracings.net profile Maylin Hausch / Daniel Wende
 Tracings.net profile Maylin Hausch

German female pair skaters
1988 births
Living people
Sportspeople from Stuttgart
Figure skaters at the 2010 Winter Olympics
Figure skaters at the 2014 Winter Olympics
Olympic figure skaters of Germany